The Indian edition of BBC TopGear is published by Worldwide Media Pvt. Ltd (WWM), a sub-division of The Times of India Group formed in 2005 as a joint venture with the BBC.

The magazine is published out of the Times of India Building, opposite Chhatrapati Shivaji Terminus Railway Station. The first edition was launched in September 2005.

BBC TopGear is an automotive magazine with a lifestyle flavor. So apart from road tests its USP are its surreal features which normally test the cars and bikes in various environment and talks a lot about driver interactions with the car and not just the technical specifications. The magazine has made a niche for itself with its take on automotive journalism.

WWM, led by Deepak Lamba (CEO), also publishes other popular titles like Femina, Filmfare, Grazia India, Hello, BBC Good Homes India, BBC Knowledge and Lonely Planet Magazine India.

See also
Top Gear (magazine)
Dhaval Dhairyawan (Former Chief Photographer)
List of magazines in India

References

External links

2005 establishments in Maharashtra
Automobile magazines
English-language magazines published in India
Monthly magazines published in India
Magazines established in 2005
Magazine India
Mass media in Mumbai